Abareq (also Romanized as Ābāreq; also known as Ābārak-e Bālā, Abargh, Ebareg Bālā, Ebareg-e Bālā, Ebāreg-e Bālā, Ebāreq-e Bālā, and Erbārag-e Bālā) is a village in Howmeh Rural District, in the Central District of Bam County, Kerman Province, Iran. At the 2006 census, its population was 1,896, in 457 families.

References 

Populated places in Bam County